Rafael Garba (born 4 January 1944) is an Argentine rower. He competed in the men's coxed pair event at the 1972 Summer Olympics.

References

1944 births
Living people
Argentine male rowers
Olympic rowers of Argentina
Rowers at the 1972 Summer Olympics
Place of birth missing (living people)